Tsubasa: Reservoir Chronicle, known in Japan as , is a Japanese anime television series based on the manga series of the same name created by Clamp. The plot follows how Sakura, the princess of the Kingdom of Clow, loses all her memories and how Syaoran, a young archaeologist who is her childhood friend, goes on arduous adventures to save her, with two other companions. The Dimensional Witch Yūko Ichihara instructs him to go with two people, Kurogane and Fai D. Flowright. They search for Sakura's memories, which were scattered in various worlds in the form of angelic-like feathers, as retrieving them will help save her very being.

It wase written by Hiroyuki Kawasaki and directed by Kōichi Mashimo, with Hiroshi Morioka joining on as co-director for the second season. The music for the series was composed by Yuki Kajiura. The first season was broadcast in Japan on NHK E from April 9 to October 15, 2005. The first season features two pieces of theme music. "Blaze" performed by Kinya Kotani is the opening theme.  performed by Maaya Sakamoto is the ending theme. 

The season was released in seven DVD volumes between August 26, 2005 and February 24, 2006 by Bandai Visual. Funimation released the series in North America and United Kingdom in six volumes. Meanwhile, Madman Entertainment released it in Australia. 

A boxset was released on November 11, 2008 in North America, on March 16, 2009 in the United Kingdom, and November 12, 2008 in Australia. The entire series was released in North America on January 19, 2010.


Episode list

Home media release
Japanese

English

References

Episodes
2005 Japanese television seasons